Kiss My Amps (Live) is a live album by American rock band Tom Petty and the Heartbreakers. The album was released by Reprise Records on November 25, 2011, as a limited edition vinyl LP for the 2011 Black Friday Record Store Day.

Track listing

References

External links
 TomPetty.com—Tom Petty and The Heartbreakers official website

2011 live albums
Tom Petty live albums
Reprise Records live albums
Record Store Day releases
Rhino Records live albums